Ispat may refer to:
 Ispat English Medium School
 Mittal Steel Company
 Investment Support and Promotion Agency of Turkey